Radvenci is a dispersed settlement southwest of Gornja Radgona in northeastern Slovenia.

There is a small chapel-shrine with a belfry in the settlement. It was built in 1907.

References

External links
Radvenci on Geopedia

Populated places in the Municipality of Gornja Radgona